Anna Smashnova-Pistolesi was the defending champion, but retired in the semifinals against Cho Yoon-jeong.

Eleni Daniilidou defeated Cho 6–4, 4–6, 7–6(7–2) in the final to win her title.

Seeds

Draw

Finals

Top half

Bottom half

References 

 http://www.itftennis.com/procircuit/tournaments/women's-tournament/info.aspx?tournamentid=1100006286

WTA Auckland Open